Robert Alan Lambert (born 5 April 1998) is a British speedway rider.

Career
Born in Norwich in 1998, the son of former Mildenhall Fen Tigers rider Paul Lambert, Robert Lambert rode motorbikes from the age of 3, and competed in grasstrack as a junior starting at the age of 6, going on to compete in junior speedway in 2008. He gained much of his early racing experience in Germany between 2012 and 2013, where he was allowed to race at a high level at a younger age (14) than in the UK. He rode in 2013 for King's Lynn Young Stars in the National League, scoring 15 points in his first meeting and winning five of his six races, and was promoted straight into main body of the Stars Elite League team the following year, with the team's early fixtures arranged to ensure that he reached the age of 16 before the first meeting. He impressed with a five ride paid maximum against Eastbourne Eagles in June. He also rode in Denmark for Outrup and in Germany for Berghaupton in 2014.

Starting with an assessed CMA of 3.00, by the end of the season this had risen to 5.32. He was signed for a second year by the Stars for 2015, and was also signed by Peterborough Panthers for their 2015 Premier League campaign.

Lambert was picked in the British team for the 2014 Under-21 World Cup.

In 2017, he won the European Under-19 Cup and the European Individual Speedway Junior Championship. In 2020, Lambert became the first British rider to win the Speedway European Championship when the competition was held exclusively in Poland (over 5 rounds) due to the COVID-19 pandemic. 

In 2021, he became a world champion after Great Britain secured the 2021 Speedway of Nations (the world team title). In 2022, Lambert's good form continued and he finished in fifth place during the 2022 Speedway World Championship, after securing 103 points during the 2022 Speedway Grand Prix. The top six place finish automatically qualified him for the 2023 Speedway Grand Prix. 

Towards the end of the 2022 season Lambert returned to ride in the United Kingdom for Belle Vue Aces in the play offs, as a replacement for the injured Max Fricke. He top scored in the play off final and helped Belle Vue win the league title. He also helped Smederna win the Swedish Speedway Team Championship during the 2022 campaign.

Major results

World individual Championship
2018 Speedway Grand Prix - 30th
2019 Speedway Grand Prix - 15th
2021 Speedway Grand Prix - 10th
2022 Speedway Grand Prix - 5th

World team Championships
2017 Speedway World Cup - 5th
2016 Speedway World Cup - runner up
2017 Speedway World Cup - 4th
2018 Speedway of Nations - runner up
2019 Speedway of Nations - 7th
2020 Speedway of Nations - 6th
2021 Speedway of Nations - Winner
2022 Speedway of Nations - runner up

References

1998 births
Living people
English motorcycle racers
British speedway riders
British Speedway Championship winners
King's Lynn Young Stars riders
King's Lynn Stars riders
Newcastle Diamonds riders
Peterborough Panthers riders
Rye House Rockets riders